Zena Virginia Keefe (June 26, 1896 – November 16, 1977) was an American actress in silent film, active in the 1910s and 1920s.

Early years
Keefe was born on June 26, 1896, in San Francisco, California. Her parents were James P. Keefe and Allie Turbiville Keefe. When Keefe was three years old, she appeared in a production of Brownies in Fairyland. She was educated at a convent in San Francisco until she and her parents moved to New York.

Career 
For three seasons, Keefe portrayed Little Mother in a touring production of The Fatal Wedding. She left the theater to appear in films with Vitagraph, but after less than a year with that company she began performing as a featured attraction in Keith Vaudeville. Late in 1914, she went back to Vitagraph.

Keefe's film debut in short films occurred in 1911. By 1916, she was playing a substantial role in films including Her Maternal Right, and leading roles in films like Enlighten Thy Daughter (1917).  She continued to appear in at least a few movies every year, until her final appearance in Trouping with Ellen in 1924.

Keefe's work in films included the serial The Perils of Girl Reporters. Studios for which she worked included Selznick Pictures.

Personal life and death 
Keefe married William M. Brownell.

Keefe died on November 16, 1977, in Danvers, Massachusetts.

Selected filmography
 Mills of the Gods (1912) as Maria, Giulia's sister
 Her Choice (1912) as Edith, the poor niece
 The Hero of Submarine D-2 (1916) as Ethel McMasters
 Her Maternal Right (1916) as Mary Winslow
 La Bohème (1916) as Musette
 Caprice of the Mountains (1916)
 Little Miss Happiness (1916) as Sadie Allen
 The Rail Rider (1916) as Mildred Barker
 Perils of Our Girl Reporters (1916)
 Enlighten Thy Daughter (1917) as Lillian Stevens
 The Challenge Accepted (1918)
 An Amateur Widow (1919)
 Piccadilly Jim (1919) as Ann Chester
 The Woman God Sent (1920)
 His Wife's Money (1920)
 Out of the Snows (1920)
 Red Foam (1920)
 Marooned Hearts (1920) as Marion Ainsworth
 Proxies (1921) as Clare Conway
 After Midnight (1921) as Mrs. Phillips
 The Broken Silence (1922) 
 The Broken Violin (1923) as Governess
 None So Blind (1923) 
 Trouping with Ellen (1924) as Mabel Llewellyn
 Who's Cheating? (1924) as Myrtle Meers
 Another Man's Wife (1924) as Dancer

References

External links

1896 births
1977 deaths
American film actresses
American silent film actresses
Actresses from San Francisco
20th-century American actresses
American stage actresses
Vaudeville performers
Film serial actresses